Uncertain T is a show car built by Car Craft photographer Steve Scott in 1965.

Construction details 
The chassis is steel tube, painted red. The transmission and quick-change rear axle casing were painted brown, the rack and pinion and torsion bar tube yellow.

The body was fiberglass, resembling the Model T "phonebooth" coupé, steeply raked forward, with a "wind-up key" in the rear section. When it debuted, the body was painted a deep candy red (applied by Bill Cushenbery). The upholstery was done by Lee Wells. The steering wheel was a four-spoke design, mounted vertically.

The car ran on narrow spoked motorcycle wheels in front and wide five-spoked wheels in back.

Torsion bar front suspension was a rarity in customs (or any cars) at the time. Scott's use of a 1960 MGA rack and pinion to operate the drag link was also innovative.

While the car ran, it had no suspension, no shock absorbers, and no front brakes, effectively making it a trailer queen.

History 

Uncertain T debuted at a carshow as part of the 1965 Winternats at Pomona in February 1965, and appeared in the  May issue of Car Craft.  It was on the cover of November's Car Craft, which had a three-page feature (with only black and white photos) inside.

About a month after completion, Scott had the car repainted metalflake brick orange by Junior's House of Color, before entering "Uncertain T" in the Oakland Roadster Show; in this new color scheme, it toured the U.S., and won a number of trophies.  Some time later, the engine and chassis details were repainted yellow.

"Uncertain T" also appeared in Hot Rod in July, August, and September 1966. In the September issue, it was listed as for sale, with a price of US$7000; usual for a used custom car was $2000 to $3000.

In 1966, "Uncertain T" was offered as a Monogram model kit.

Around 1970, the car, then painted metallic gold, was sold to a California resident. Ownership could not be established, and in 2003 was still unknown.

Featured appearances 
Car Craft Magazine, November 1965.
Street Rodder, July 2003

Notes

Sources 
Ganahl, Pat. "Uncertain T", in Street Rodder, July 2003, pp. 74–6.

Modified vehicles
Automotive styling features
One-off cars
Buick vehicles

1950s cars
1960s cars
Kustom Kulture
Individual cars